The Fuld-Gilad-Herring Academy of Competitive Intelligence is an educational organization bringing professional training to the field of competitive intelligence (CI).  Established in 1996, the Academy has expanded its training to thousands of managers from 58 countries and six continents at its campuses in Cambridge, MA and Brussels, Belgium. The Academy is the only CI-dedicated institution to be externally accredited by the International Accreditors for Continuing Education and Training (IACET). It grants the Competitive Intelligence Professional (CIP) certification based on a 9-course program, including a course in ethics and a pioneering course in business war gaming. To be certified, managers must complete the required coursework and pass a certification exam. To accommodate managers whose main interest is in using CI tools and managers working as CI professionals, the Academy offers two levels of certification: a basic CIP-I, and an advanced CIP-II. The Academy is currently the largest training institute in its field.

Competitive Intelligence Standards 

On March, 2011, the board of the professional association in the field of competitive intelligence, Strategic and Competitive Intelligence Professionals (SCIP) voted to adopt the Academy's CIP program as its official global certification program to help create standards in the field of strategic and competitive intelligence. The certification was renamed SCIP-CIP certificate conferred by ACI.

History

The history of the Academy tracks closely the history of the field of competitive intelligence which has risen in importance during the 1980s with the increase in global competitive pressures and the spread of Internet search engines which made information more accessible. In 1986, the Society of Competitive Intelligence Professionals (SCIP) was founded in Washington, DC to serve as the professional association for academics, practitioners and consultants in CI. During the next decade, organizations experimented in acquiring and using CI with little discipline and no consistent results. For example, as a survey by the Academy showed, one of CI's main objectives, avoiding strategic surprises, was not being accomplished in many large companies. Three early developers of the Society banded together to create a standard of training and performance in the field. They were: Leonard Fuld, whose book, Competitor Intelligence, was the first best seller on the subject, Ben Gilad, whose book The Business Intelligence System created the benchmark for setting up a corporate CI function, and Jan Herring who was the founding director of the first competitive intelligence function created in 1982 at Motorola Corp. Together with the growth of SCIP, the creation of the Academy accelerated greatly the formalization and acceptance of CI functions and positions across global companies, with some estimating that 97% of Fortune 500 corporations today have at least one CI analyst in each of their larger business units.

Competition

As the field continued to evolve, several organizations in recent years have joined the Academy in offering training programs in competitive intelligence, mostly as an extension of other degree programs, among them Mercyhurst College Institute for Intelligence Studies in PA (an extension of a government intelligence program), Simmons College in MA (part of Library and Information studies), and the University of Denver in CO (part of a graduate degree in information management). Other programs include the Ecole de Guerre Economique in France and Institute for Competitive Intelligence in Germany. Entry level courses are also offered by the Society of Competitive Intelligence Professionals.

Student body

The functional distribution of the Academy's alumni body covers managers and professionals from competitive and market intelligence functions, marketing, market research, business development, strategic planning, research scientists and development engineers. Though the typical trainee is a manager at a Global Fortune 500 company, past participants included some unusual representatives from the Catholic Church, various governments' defense agencies, farmer cooperatives, national economic development boards, and a cabinet minister.

Faculty

Leonard M. Fuld
Michael Sandman, B.S. (Clark University), MA, M.B.A. (Cornell University)
Dr. Helen Rothberg, Ph.D., MPhil. (City University of New York), M.B.A. (City University of New York at Baruch College), associate professor at Marist College School of Management
Jan Herring, BSc. (University of Missouri)
Ashish Nanda, A.M. (Harvard University), Ph.D. (Harvard Business School), associate professor at the Harvard Law School
Jules Schwartz, Ph.D. (Harvard Business School), former dean and a professor emeritus of Boston University School of Management, former faculty member Wharton School
Ben Gilad, former strategy professor at Rutgers University School of Management
Jay Paap, Ph.D. (MIT Sloan), has held faculty positions at Sloan and Indiana University
Dan Mulligan, M.A. (USMA Westpoint), Assistant Professor at the Mercyhurst College Institute for Intelligence Studies

Advisory board

The Academy's advisory board includes executives from US-based Intel, Procter and Gamble, Genentech, Blue Cross Blue Shield, Microsoft, Fidelity and Wyeth corporations, as well as Europe-based Shell, Roche, TetraPak and Orange, and Mexico-based Cemex.

References

Business intelligence organizations
Market research organizations
Strategic management
Competition (economics)